Kingsley Yeboah (born 1 June 1996) is a Ghanaian professional footballer who plays as a midfielder.

Club career
Yeboah joined Dreams FC from their youth club in 2015. He signed a three-year deal. On 24 April 2016, he made his Ghana Premier League debut with Dreams FC against Berekum Chelsea.

NK Krivaja Zavidovići
Since September 2018, he joined NK Krivaja Zavidovići in Second League of FBiH - North.

Career statistics

Club

Notes

References

External links
 

1996 births
Living people
Ghanaian footballers
Ghana Premier League players
Association football midfielders
Ghanaian expatriate footballers
Expatriate footballers in Bosnia and Herzegovina
Dreams F.C. (Ghana) players